Jean la Poudre (English:John Powder) is a 1913 French silent drama film directed by Emile Chautard and Maurice Tourneur and starring Henri Gouget and Henry Roussel. It portrays Thomas Robert Bugeaud and his part in the Conquest of Algeria in the nineteenth century.

References

Bibliography
 Waldman, Harry. Maurice Tourneur: The Life and Films. McFarland, 2001.

External links

1913 films
Films directed by Maurice Tourneur
French silent short films
Films set in Algeria
Films set in the 19th century
French historical drama films
1910s historical drama films
French black-and-white films
1913 drama films
Silent historical drama films
1910s French films
1910s French-language films